French Place is a neighborhood in Austin, Texas. It is located east of IH-35 on the north side of town.

Description
The French Place neighborhood is a conglomeration of families, small businesses, students, and single professionals.  French Place is considered one of Austin's older communities, having been originally owned by the Giles family in the 1940s.  Residents benefit from nearby amenities, proximity to the University of Texas and to downtown.
 
French Place is bordered by Wilshire Boulevard to the north, Manor Road to the south, Cherrywood Road to the east and Interstate 35 to the west.

Students attend Maplewood Elementary, Kealing Junior High School and McCallum High School.  Recreational facilities for athletic activities include Alamo Parkland Recreation Center and Patterson Park.

References

Neighborhoods in Austin, Texas